The Cherendey (Çerendey) is a river in Yakutia (Sakha Republic), Russia.

The river flows across an uninhabited area of the Olyokminsky District. Abandoned Cherendey village is located by the left bank of the Lena, close to its confluence.

Course  
The Cherendey is a left tributary of the Lena. The river heads in a roughly southeastern direction across a taiga area. In mid course it bends to the northeast and flows slowly and meandering in a wide, swampy valley.

There are lakes and swamps in the upper part of its basin. The river freezes yearly between October and May.

See also
List of rivers of Russia

References

External links 
Fishing & Tourism in Yakutia

Central Siberian Plateau
Rivers of the Sakha Republic